Fox Lake is a village in Grant and Antioch townships in Lake County, Illinois and Burton Township, McHenry County, Illinois, United States. The population was 10,978 at the 2020 census. It is located approximately 57 miles north of Chicago.

History

The village was incorporated on December 15, 1906, and certified by the state on April 13, 1907. The area was first explored during the 17th century by the French. In the late 19th century, it was known as Nippersink Point.  Early in the 20th century, there were but a few hundred residents. During the summer season, however, the population would reach an estimated 20,000 people, and at its peak, the area had 50 hotels and 2,000 cottages.  Infamous Chicago gangster Al Capone is reported to have utilized an establishment now known as the Mineola Hotel and Restaurant as a hideout, although this has never been documented.  In 1979, the Mineola was listed on the National Register of Historic Places and may be the largest wooden frame structure in the state.

Many Chicagoans have established summer homes in Fox Lake. The village is situated among the Chain O'Lakes, where swimming, boating, jet skiing, tubing and boarding are popular activities. In 2006, there were an estimated 28,000 boats registered on the lake system.

Boating accidents are prevalent in today's society, however, number of accidents on Fox Lake have decreased in part to stricter regulations on boating under the influence of alcohol and other factors. Fiscal year 2010 had only one accident and death by boat. That number rose in 2015 to 3 accidents, 1 injury and 1 death. The two fatalities in 2015 were caused by drowning due to alcohol use.

Fox Lake came under the national spotlight in September 2015 when Lt. Joe Gliniewicz of the Fox Lake Police Department was found shot to death in a marsh after radioing that he was pursuing three subjects. The subsequent manhunt for the alleged shooters employed over 400 law enforcement personnel, impacted the entire local community, and sparked a debate in the media regarding the "War on Cops" and the Black Lives Matter movement. Thousands of people, including Governor Bruce Rauner, gathered for a funeral and memorial procession to show their support. After a two-month investigation, authorities concluded that Gliniewicz committed "a carefully staged suicide". It was learned that he had been involved in financial malfeasance related to his job as the head of the local Police Explorers program and had even attempted to hire a gang member to kill the village administrator who he was concerned would discover his crimes during her financial audit of the program.

Village government
"Fox Lake incorporated under a Village form of government, with an elected village president, six trustees, and a village clerk.  The village president is also recognized as the mayor." The table below is a list of mayors from the village's inception in 1907 to present.

Geography
The village center is located on the east shore of Pistakee Lake, and south shore of Nippersink Lake and Fox Lake, three connected water bodies that form part of the Chain O'Lakes system, flowing southwest via the Fox River to the Illinois River. The village limits extend north in a sinuous manner all the way to the Wisconsin border.

Major streets
 Wilmot Road
 State Park Road
 Grass Lake Road
  U.S. Route 12
  Grand Avenue
  Illinois Route 173
 Rollins Road
 Big Hollow Road
 Nippersink Road

Demographics

2020 census

2000 Census
As of the census of 2000, there were 9,178 people, 4,046 households, and 2,330 families residing in the village. The racial makeup of the village was 95.5% White, 0.8% African American, 0.2% Native American, 0.7% Asian, 0.1% Pacific Islander, 1.5% from other races, and 1.3% from two or more races. Hispanic or Latino of any race were 5.8% of the population.

There were 4,046 households, out of which 26.1% had children under the age of 18 living with them, 44.4% were married couples living together, 9.0% had a female householder with no husband present, and 42.4% were non-families. 35.4% of all households were made up of individuals, and 13.4% had someone living alone who was 65 years of age or older. The average household size was 2.27 and the average family size was 2.98.

In the village, the population was spread out, with 22.7% under the age of 18, 8.1% from 18 to 24, 33.1% from 25 to 44, 22.2% from 45 to 64, and 14.0% who were 65 years of age or older. The median age was 37 years. For every 100 females, there were 100.8 males. For every 100 females age 18 and over, there were 98.5 males.

The median income for a household in the village was $46,548, and the median income for a family was $58,843. Males had a median income of $42,009 versus $29,063 for females. The per capita income for the village was $24,350.  6.4% of the population and 4.1% of families were below the poverty line.  Out of the total population, 7.2% of those under the age of 18 and 9.1% of those 65 and older were living below the poverty line.

Education
 Grant Community High School (9–12)
 Fox Lake Grade School District #114
 Stanton Middle School (5–8)
 Big Hollow Elementary School Big Hollow School District 38 (K–8)
 Saint Bede School (K–8)
 Gavin Elementary School (was across the hwy from St. Bede's Catholic School)

Notable people 

 Billy Klaus, shortstop and third basemen for six Major League Baseball teams; born in Fox Lake. His brother, Bobby Klaus, was also a Major League Ball Player.
 Ann-Margret, Ann-Margret Olsson, actor, singer, dancer ("Carnal Knowledge," "Tommy") Once lived in Fox Lake. She is related to Marius "Bossie” Olsen, former mayor.
 Alexander Joseph McGavick, bishop of the Roman Catholic Diocese of La Crosse
 Joe Gliniewicz, retired U.S. Army NCO and corrupt police lieutenant who committed suicide – death was first seen as a murder

References

External links

 Village of Fox Lake

1907 establishments in Illinois
Chicago metropolitan area
Populated places established in 1907
Villages in Illinois
Villages in Lake County, Illinois
Villages in McHenry County, Illinois